= Gabi ng Parangal =

Gabi ng Parangal (lit. 'Awards Night') may refer to the awarding ceremony of:

- Metro Manila Film Festival
- FAMAS Award
